The 2003 World Marathon Cup was the tenth edition of the World Marathon Cup of athletics and were held in Paris, France, inside of the 2003 World Championships.

Results

See also
2003 World Championships in Athletics – Men's Marathon
2003 World Championships in Athletics – Women's Marathon

References

External links
 IAAF web site

World Marathon Cup
World
1993 in Spanish sport
Marathons in France
International athletics competitions hosted by France